Fantasy Island, also known as Blumhouse's Fantasy Island, is a 2020 American supernatural horror film directed and co-written by Jeff Wadlow. Serving both as a horror reimagining and a prequel to ABC's 1977 television series of the same name, it stars Michael Peña, Maggie Q, Lucy Hale, Austin Stowell, Jimmy O. Yang, Ryan Hansen, Portia Doubleday, and Michael Rooker and follows a group of people who, while visiting the eponymous island, discover that their dream-like fantasies brought to life begin to turn into horrific living nightmares and they must try to survive.

Fantasy Island was theatrically released in the United States on February 14, 2020 by Sony Pictures Releasing to generally negative reviews from critics. Despite this, the film was a box office success, grossing $49 million worldwide against its $7 million production budget.

Plot 
Businesswoman Gwen Olsen, former police officer Patrick Sullivan, step-brothers J. D. and Brax Weaver, and teenager Melanie Cole arrive at Fantasy Island, a tropical resort where fantasies apparently come true. Upon arrival, island proprietor Mr. Roarke guides the guests to their fantasies: Patrick is enlisted in a war in honor of his late father; the Weavers become honor guests at a mansion rave; Melanie takes revenge on her childhood bully Sloane Maddison; and Gwen accepts her ex-boyfriend Allen Chambers' marriage proposal, which she rejected many years ago.

Melanie learns that Sloane was kidnapped and brought to Fantasy Island against her will. She saves her from a masked surgeon and both run away. Meanwhile, Patrick is captured by a military platoon and taken to their commander, Lieutenant Sullivan, whom Patrick recognizes as his father. As night falls, the surgeon attacks Melanie and Sloane again before Damon, a private investigator, kills him. Damon reveals that Roarke offered him to see his deceased daughter again. However, his fantasy turned into a nightmare that trapped him on the island. He also explains that the fantasies are created by spring water under a glowing rock in a cave. The trio collect some spring water and heads to the resort for help. Gwen wakes up the next morning to find she has a daughter with Allen and becomes dissatisfied. When Roarke explains that the fantasies must be fulfilled so that his own fantasy of being with his deceased wife can continue, Gwen convinces him to give her the fantasy she really wanted: to save a neighbour who died in a fire.

Unknown to the guests, Fantasy Island begins to turn the fantasies into living nightmares as the Weavers are taken hostage by a drug cartel associated with the mansion's owner, and Gwen is taken to the night she accidentally started a fire that killed her neighbor Nick Taylor. She finds out that the other guests, except Melanie, were also there and attempts to save Nick, fails and is rescued by Roarke's assistant, Julia. Elsewhere, Sullivan's soldiers are summoned to rescue the Weavers. After being shot dead, the cartel reanimate as zombies who attack the soldiers. In the ensuing gunfight, J. D. is fatally shot and Sullivan sacrifices himself so Patrick and Brax can escape.

Melanie and Sloane are ambushed by the zombified surgeon until Damon leaps over a cliff with him, saving them at the cost of his own life. The remaining guests regroup at the resort, but are cornered by Roarke, who reveals that they are in a fantasy in which they are all killed. Realizing that everyone was involved in Nick's death (Melanie says that Nick asked her out that night and she turned him down, which is the reason he was in the apartment), the guests assume it is Julia's fantasy as they believe that Julia was Nick's mother. The guests escape to the dock to be rescued by a plane sent by Damon's associates, but it is shot down. In response, the guests run to the cave to destroy the glowing rock with a grenade Patrick is carrying. Suddenly, Melanie stabs Patrick and takes Sloane hostage, revealing that it is her true fantasy. She orchestrated their arrival to seek revenge on them for Nick's death, with whom she had a date and was convinced was her soulmate. Julia is revealed to be Roarke's wife, brought back by the power of the island dying of a terminal disease she was suffering from when she met Roarke, and convinces him to help the guests before disappearing.

Sloane remembers the spring water she collected before and wishes Melanie "to be" forever with Nick. As a result, a zombified Nick attacks Melanie and drags her into the water. Before drowning, Melanie detonates the grenade, but Patrick sacrifices himself and falls on it to protect the others. As the fantasy concludes, Gwen, Sloane, and Brax wake up at the resort, where Roarke agrees to let them go. While the guests board a plane to leave the now-purified Fantasy Island, Brax wishes for J. D. to come back to life but Roarke explains Brax must stay on the island for his fantasy to come true. After Gwen, Sloane, and a resurrected J. D. depart, Roarke asks Brax to become his new assistant. Remembering a nickname J. D. gave him, Brax chooses to rename himself "Tattoo", initiating the events of the 1977 television series.

Cast

Main

Supporting

Production
In July 2018, it was announced that a horror film adaptation of the Fantasy Island television series was being developed at Blumhouse Productions and Sony Pictures. It was described as "a mix of Westworld and The Cabin in the Woods". Jeff Wadlow was set to direct as well as co-write the screenplay, and co-produce.

In October 2018, Michael Peña, Jimmy O. Yang, Dave Bautista, and Lucy Hale joined the cast. In November 2018, during an interview, Wadlow disclosed that Maggie Q, Portia Doubleday, and Ryan Hansen were added as well, though Bautista was no longer to appear in the film. Michael Rooker, Charlotte McKinney, Parisa Fitz-Henley, Austin Stowell, and Mike Vogel were cast in January 2019.

Filming locations
Most filming was in Viani Bay, Fiji. Minor scenes were filmed in New York and Mississippi.

Music
On February 14, 2020, Madison Gate Records released the score soundtrack for the film composed by Bear McCreary. Jared Lee performed a track titled "Don’t Wish Your Life Away", which appeared in the film's end credits and was released as a single on January 31, 2020.

Release
Fantasy Island was released on February 14, 2020. It originally was scheduled to open on February 28, 2020, before being moved up, with another Blumhouse production, The Invisible Man, being set for its original date.

Home media
Fantasy Island was released on digital on April 14, 2020. and on Blu-ray and DVD on May 12, 2020.

Reception

Box office
Fantasy Island grossed $27.4 million in the United States and Canada, and $21.6 million in other territories, for a worldwide total of $49 million, against a production budget of $7 million.

In the United States and Canada, the film was released alongside Sonic the Hedgehog, The Photograph and Downhill, and was projected to gross $13–20 million from 2,770 theaters in its opening weekend. It made $5.7 million on its first day, and went on to debut to $12.6 million for its first three days, and a total $14 million over four, finishing third at the box office.

Critical response
On Rotten Tomatoes, the film had an approval rating of 8% based on 110 critics, with an average rating of 3.4/10. The site's critics consensus read: "Fantasy Island tries to show audiences the dark side of wish fulfillment, but mainly serves as a cautionary tale about the dangers of exhuming long-dead franchises." On Metacritic, the film had a score of 22 out of 100 based on 29 critic reviews, indicating "generally unfavorable reviews". Audiences polled by CinemaScore gave the film an average grade of "C−" on an A+ to F scale.

Richard Roeper of the Chicago Sun-Times called the film "inane" and "contrived," and wrote that "it feels like someone planted about a half-dozen different scripts all over this Fantasy Island." Peter Travers of Rolling Stone gave the film zero out of five stars, writing, "If crimes against cinema merited prosecution, Blumhouse's Fantasy Island would go directly to death row...The only genuine, blood-curdling scream incited by this stupefyingly dull time- and money-waster comes at the end, when the notion dawns that [the film] is meant to spawn sequels. Stop it now, before it kills again." Peter Sobczynski of RogerEbert.com wrote that the film "contains less raw terror in its entirety than Sonic the Hedgehog during any five minutes of its running time," calling it "utterly boring" and "no sane person's fantasy of a half-decent movie." Benjamin Lee of The Guardian gave the film 2/5 stars, describing it as "an odd attempt at genre-surfing that ends up well out of its depth".

Accolades

References

External links
 
 
 
 

2020 films
2020 fantasy films
2020 horror films
2020s English-language films
2020s fantasy adventure films
2020s supernatural horror films
American fantasy adventure films
Prequel films
American supernatural horror films
American zombie films
Blumhouse Productions films
Columbia Pictures films
Fantasy Island
Films based on television series
Films directed by Jeff Wadlow
Films produced by Jason Blum
Films set in 2020
Films set on islands
Films shot in Fiji
Holiday horror films
Jungle adventure films
Films scored by Bear McCreary
Films about vacationing
2020s American films
American prequel films